Bussière-Galant is a commune in the Haute-Vienne department in the Nouvelle-Aquitaine region in western France. Bussière-Galant station has rail connections to Bordeaux, Périgueux and Limoges.

Inhabitants are known as Bussiérois.

Elephant Haven 
In 2017, construction of a "retirement home" for elephants named Elephant Haven was begun in the commune of Saint-Nicolas-Courbefy, not far from Bussière-Galant.

Notable people
 Irène de Maulmont, known as Gina Palerme (1885 - 1977), is an actress, dancer and singer of French music hall
 Yoo Byung-eun businessman and a South Korean amateur photographer. Owner of the village of Courbefy located in the commune

See also
Communes of the Haute-Vienne department

References

Communes of Haute-Vienne